Hagop Souren Akiskal (16 January 1944 – 20 January 2021) was a Lebanese-born American psychiatrist and professor, of Armenian descent. He is best known for his research on temperament and bipolar disorder (manic depression), revolutionizing the field of clinical psychiatry.

Biography 
Hagop Souren Akiskal was born on 16 January 1944 in Beirut, Lebanon; to Armenian parents.

He received his M.D. from the American University of Beirut in 1969. He completed his residency training in psychiatry at University of Wisconsin–Madison. Akiskal then worked for several years as a clinician and mood disorders researcher and Professor of Psychiatry and Pharmacology at the University of Tennessee, Memphis. He was senior science advisor at NIMH from 1990 to 1994, before moving to the University of California, San Diego.

He was a leading conceptual thinker in the area of bipolar sub-typing, Akiskal was a fastidious researcher and an astute clinical observer. He was a devotee of Emil Kraepelin; he believed that the nosologic (classification) pendulum is gradually swinging back towards Kraepelin's original unitary concept of the bipolar spectrum of mood disorders (Lieber, Arnold).

Akiskal rose to prominence with his integrative theory of depression. Subsequently, he established chronic depressions as treatable mood disorders. His research on cyclothymia paved the way for understanding the childhood antecedents of bipolarity, and helped in the worldwide renaissance of the temperament field. His focus on subthreshold mood disorders enlarged the boundaries of bipolar disorders. He received the gold medal for Pioneer Research (Society of Biological Psychiatry), the German Anna Monika Prize for Depression, the NARSAD Prize for Affective Disorders, the 2002 Jean Delay Prize for international collaborative research (World Psychiatric Association), as well as the French Jules Baillarger and the Italian Aretaeus Prizes for his research on the bipolar spectrum.

Akiskal has pioneered in the study of outpatient mood disorders. At the University of Tennessee, he established mood clinics which have had worldwide appeal because of his philosophy of conducting clinical training and research while delivering high quality care. His clinical expertise ranged from dysthymia to bipolar spectrum disorders, as well as comorbidity, resistant depression, interface of personality with mood disorders, mixed states, anxious bipolarity, and PTSD. In 2003, he received the Ellis Island Medal of Honor "for exceptional national humanitarian service."

He was a highly prolific writer of articles in psychiatry and the editor of several academic journals, including serving as a co-Editor-in-Chief of the Journal of Affective Disorders. He has received a number of honors for his work on temperament and bipolar spectrum disorders.

Akiskal died of natural causes at age 77, on January 20, 2021, in La Jolla in San Diego, California.

References

External links
 Faculty profile page  at UCSD
 

American psychiatrists
21st-century American psychologists
Bipolar disorder researchers
Psychiatry academics
Lebanese psychiatrists
American University of Beirut alumni
University of Wisconsin–Madison alumni
University of Tennessee faculty
University of California, San Diego faculty
Lebanese people of Armenian descent
Lebanese emigrants to the United States
American people of Armenian descent
1944 births
2021 deaths
20th-century American psychologists